Gayatri Raje Puar is an Indian politician and member of the Bharatiya Janata Party. Pawar is a member of the Madhya Pradesh Legislative Assembly from the Dewas constituency in Dewas district. She was married to the late Maharaja of Dewas Senior Tukoji Rao Pawar (1963-2015).

References 

People from Dewas
People from Dewas district
Bharatiya Janata Party politicians from Madhya Pradesh
Living people
21st-century Indian politicians
Year of birth missing (living people)
Madhya Pradesh MLAs 2013–2018
Madhya Pradesh MLAs 2018–2023